Northfield School of the Liberal Arts is a private classical Christian school in Wichita, Kansas. It was established in 1993, and operates from grades 6 to 12. It has its roots in the Liberal Arts, but also puts a large emphasis on the great books: a collection of 150 books that are important to the development of western thought.

References

External links
 

1993 establishments in Kansas
Christian schools in Kansas
Classical Christian schools
Schools in Wichita, Kansas
Private middle schools in Kansas
Private high schools in Kansas
Educational institutions established in 1993